Foster (also known as Angel in the House) is a 2011 British comedy-drama film written and directed by Jonathan Newman, based on his 2005 short film. Part of it was shot at Legoland Windsor in April 2010. The film stars Golden Globe winner Toni Collette, Ioan Gruffudd, Richard E. Grant, BAFTA Award winner Hayley Mills and Maurice Cole.

Plot
Some years after their son is killed in an accident, a married couple (Collette and Gruffudd) decide to adopt a child. One day a 7-year-old boy, Eli (Cole), unexpectedly arrives on their doorstep claiming to be from the adoption agency. Eli wears a suit every day and is very well-spoken for a child. He helps the adults to process their loss, which had stifled both their marriage and their toy business, and lets them embrace life again.

Cast
 Toni Collette as Zooey
 Ioan Gruffudd as Alec
 Maurice Cole as Eli
 Hayley Mills as Mrs. Lange
 Richard E. Grant as Mr. Potts
 Anne Reid as Diane
 Daisy Beaumont as Sarah
 Bobby Smalldridge as Samuel
 Tim Beckman as Jim
 Jo Wyatt as Jane
 Haruka Kuroda as Translator

Production
Foster, the short film, premiered on HBO and BBC in 2007. It won Best Film, Best Actor (for Preston Nyman), Special Jury Prize and Best Screenplay at the Braga International Film Festival in Portugal. The film garnered Newman a nomination for BBC Three's New Filmmaker Award. It was also nominated for Best Film at the  Rhode Island Film Festival in 2006.

After the success of the short, Peter Farrelly of the Farrelly brothers became interested in the development of a feature-length film though the film was ultimately produced by Bend it Like Beckham producer Deepak Nayar. Shooting subsequently began in the spring of 2010 for six weeks on location in London.

Release
The film premiered on 18 October 2011 at the Rome Film Festival and was released in 2012.

Critical reception

Rhode Island Film Festival, 2013
Foster won Best Feature Film (Youth Jury Awards) at the Rhode Island Film Festival, 2013

Rome film festival
The film was met with positive reviews, with Italian film review site Persinsala calling it a "sweet and very moving comedy with a happy ending" and praising Cole's performance, "caught in the shoes of a child – incredibly mature for his age".

References

External links
BBC Three
Serendipity Films
Foster Movie Review

2011 films
British comedy-drama films
Features based on short films
2010s English-language films
Films directed by Jonathan Newman
2010s British films